The 1998 Internationaux de Strasbourg was a women's tennis tournament played on outdoor clay courts in Strasbourg, France that was part of Tier III of the 1998 WTA Tour. It was the 12th edition of the tournament and was held from 18 May until 24 May 1998. Second-seeded Irina Spîrlea won the singles title.

Finals

Singles

 Irina Spîrlea defeated  Julie Halard-Decugis 7–6, 6–3
 It was Spîrlea's only title of the year and the 7th of her career.

Doubles

 Alexandra Fusai /  Nathalie Tauziat defeated  Yayuk Basuki /  Caroline Vis 6–4, 6–3
 It was Fusai's 2nd title of the year and the 6th of her career. It was Tauziat's 2nd title of the year and the 20th of her career.

References

External links
 ITF tournament edition details 
 Tournament draws

Internationaux de Strasbourg
1998
Internationaux de Strasbourg
May 1998 sports events in Europe